is a generic term for the skirt worn together with , or a short jacket in , Korean traditional clothing.

History 
Basic forms of ancient  date back to the Goguryeo era (37 BC–668 AD). While the  has evolved over time, the  has remained relatively unchanged throughout time.

In Silla, China's Tang dynasty influenced the culture of Koreans; several types of Tang dynasty's clothing was also introduced in Korea. The , a form of high-waist  (a generic term for Chinese skirt) worn over a short Chinese jacket was introduced in Silla and in Balhae. This form of high-waist  which ties to the chest can still be seen in the chima worn in present days Korean women's ; it is also likely that the current women's  has been derived from the Tang dynasty's high-waist  with a short  or from a later revival of the Tang dynasty fashion.

In Joseon, the clothing which was worn during the Silla period was progressively altered until it became what is now recognized as the traditional . The Chinese court clothing which were worn in China's Tang dynasty appears to have largely influenced the design of the women's .

Design and construction

Silhouette 
The Chinese court clothing which were worn in China's Tang dynasty appears to have largely influenced the design of the women's . The  is a floor length wrap around skirt with a wide waistband positioned above the chest. With the high placement of the waistband it allows the skirt to have a more billowy look, which can give greater freedom of movement. Traditionally, women needed to wear about five to seven layers of undergarments which consisted of pants and underskirts, this made the skirt look more voluminous and provide a more elegant look. However, modern women usually wear one layer of undergarment, typically panties.

There are different kinds of : single-layered, double-layered, and quilted. The upper class usually use ramie as the fabric to make for summer  while plain and patterned silks are used throughout the remainder of the year. By contrast, commoners were restricted to using cotton for their . Women in the upper class wore a long  which falls down to the floor while women in the lower class wore a shorter  which length reaches to the calf of the leg. Korean noblewomen wore full length  to designate their social status.

Colour 

Different colours and lengths indicated important social distinctions such as: age, marital status, and class.

Korean commoners rarely wore primary coloured , and they were only allowed to wear it for special occasions, such as seasonal festivals, weddings, and for ceremonial events. Nowadays, the  worn by Korean is colourful due to the Western influences which Korean to become a free society where Koreans could choose what and what colours they want to wear. Wearing colourful  is, however, a clear contrast from the traditional use of white .

Koreans has traditionally liked to be dressed in the colour white ; the liking for white clothing can be traced backed thousand of years ago in Buyeo. In Korean culture, white has traditionally been a symbol of nobility and innocence; and a result, Koreans would wear white during their lives from birth to death. Moreover, the Korean commoners' clothing were mainly un-dyed and plain. Korean people often being nicknamed “the white clad [people]”. In Goryeo and Joseon, the use of white clothing was banned by King Chung Yeol in the 13th century and by many Joseon kings which even included King Sejong, but this did not stop the tradition of wearing white clothing to continue until the early 20th century. In Modern times, the use of white hanbok is often associated with resistance and is mostly worn for funerals.

Girls and unmarried women usually wore red skirts, while married women and middle-aged women wore blue skirts and elderly women wore gray skirts.

See also
Chima jeogori
Baji (clothing)
Dangui
Wonsam
Hwarot
– Chinese equivalent

References

Korean clothing
Skirts